Bloom: Remix Album is the second remix album by Canadian singer Sarah McLachlan, released in North America on 6 September 2005 by Nettwerk in Canada and Arista Records in the United States. It includes various dance club versions of McLachlan's songs, remixed by prominent remixers and producers.

Content
Bloom: Remix Album features mainly remixes of songs which originally appeared on McLachlan's 2003 studio album, Afterglow. It includes already known remixes of three singles: "Fallen", "Stupid" and "World on Fire", and new remixes of "Train Wreck", "Answer" and "Dirty Little Secret". The album also contains new remixes of two songs taken from Fumbling Towards Ecstasy (1993) and of her debut single "Vox" from Touch (1988). Bloom: Remix Album also features a remix of a new song, "Just Like Me" by DMC featuring Mclachlan. Songs were remixed by Junkie XL, Rollo Armstrong from Faithless, Tom Middleton, Thievery Corporation, DJ Hyper, Sly and Robbie, will.i.am, Talvin Singh, Gabriel & Dresden and Junior Boys. The Japanese edition also includes "Fallen" (Satoshi Tomiie Mix).

In 2008, "Dirty Little Secret" (Thievery Corporation Mix) was included on the Bones: Original Television Soundtrack.

Commercial performance
The album peaked at number twenty-two in Canada. In the United States, it reached number two on the Dance/Electronic Albums and number seventy-six on the Billboard 200. It was held from the top on the Dance/Electronic Albums by Demon Days by the Gorillaz.

In 2004, "Fallen" and "World on Fire" already peaked on the US Dance Club Songs at number three and two, respectively.

Track listing

Charts

Weekly charts

Year-end charts

See also
Remixed

References

2005 remix albums
Nettwerk Records remix albums
Arista Records remix albums
Sarah McLachlan remix albums
Albums produced by Pierre Marchand